Richard O'Gorman (23 December 1892 – 17 February 1963) was an Irish hurler who played for Cork Championship club Midleton. He played for the Cork senior hurling team for a number of years, during which time he usually lined out in the forwards.

Honours

Midleton
Cork Senior Hurling Championship (1): 1916

Cork
All-Ireland Senior Hurling Championship (1): 1919
Munster Senior Hurling Championship (2): 1919, 1920

References

1892 births
1963 deaths
Midleton hurlers
Cork inter-county hurlers
All-Ireland Senior Hurling Championship winners